Changzhou Senior High School was founded on November 15, 1907. It is located in the downtown of Changzhou, which is a city with 2500 years of history. It is adjacent to the picturesque local attractions Hongmei Park and Tianning Temple. In a 2016 ranking of Chinese high schools that send students to study in American universities, Changzhou Senior High School ranked number 49 in mainland China in terms of the number of students entering top American universities.

History
The predecessor of Changzhou Senior High School was Changzhou Institution founded in 756. It was transformed to Changzhou Secondary School in 1907. The school had endured the wars and the disorder of the society during the first few decades in the 20th century. With several changes in the school names and systems, the school has evolved to Changzhou Senior High School as it is now. More than 400 thousands students graduated over more than 100 years since founded. Amongst them many have become celebrities and influenced tremendously in various fields in the nation.

Notable alumni

Political leaders

 Qu Qiubai (1899–1935)
 Zhang Tailei (1898–1927)
 Hu Ping (1930 -): Zhejiang Jiaxing people. A former Fujian province, Department of Commerce minister.
 Jiang Zhuping (1937 -): Jiangsu Yixing people. A former Hubei provincial governor, secretary of the CPC Hubei Provincial Committee book.
 Tianming Jiang (1997 - ): Wesleyan University Mama Mia Pianist

Scholars
 Liu Bannong (1891–1934), famous modern poet, a prominent figure in the New Culture Movement.
 Liu Tianhua (1895–1932): musician. Jiangsu Jiangyin people, 1909-1911 study in the school. 1915-1922 taught in school. A former Peking University, Professor at such schools.
 Ch'ien Mu (1895–1990): a Chinese historian, educator, philosopher and Confucian considered one of the greatest historians and philosophers in 20th-century China.
 Ling Chun-sheng (1902–1981), the national scientists, Academia Sinica. Jiangsu Wu Jin people. School graduation in 1919. Served as the first Director in Ethnic Studies at the Academia Sinica.
 Lu Shuxiang (1904–1998): linguist. Jiangsu Danyang City people. School graduation in 1922. A former researcher at the Institute, Chinese Academy of Languages, the Director. His major works include "Chinese grammar slightly" and so on.
 Zhou Youguang (1906–2017): spoken and written language scientist. Jiangsu Province Changzhou people. Graduated in 1923.
 Tao Jinchao (1908–1992): jurist. Jiangsu Liyang people. School graduation in 1926. Served as the legal system of the Fifth National People's Congress Standing Committee and deputy director.
 Tao Lu Jia (1917 -): high-ranking Communist Party. Jiangsu Liyang people. The thirties in the school reading. Served as first secretary of the CPC Shanxi Provincial Committee.
 Yun Zhiwei (1982 -): Professor of Mathematics at MIT specializing in number theory, algebraic geometry and representation theory. Have won SASTRA Ramanujan Prize in 2012.

Fellow
 Pan Shu (1897–1988): Chinese Academy of Sciences. Psychologists. Jiangsu Yixing people. Graduate school in 1917. Former Nanjing principal, director of Chinese Academy of Sciences Institute of Psychology.
 Wu Rukang (1916 -): Chinese Academy of Sciences. Anthropologist. Jiangsu Province Changzhou people. Graduate school in 1935. Of Vertebrate Paleontology and Paleoanthropology Chinese Academy of Sciences Institute, Deputy Director.
 Chen Taiyi (1921 -): Chinese Academy of Engineering. Communications systems engineering experts. Jiangsu Yixing people. 1933-1934 school years in the school. A former People's Liberation Army Nanjing Institute of Communications Engineering Vice-President.
 Hou Yunde (1929 -): Chinese Academy of Engineering. Virologist. Jiangsu Province Changzhou people. Graduate school in 1948. China Preventive Medicine research scientist.

Others
 Tang Jun (1962 -): Jiangsu Changzhou people. Served as Microsoft Company (China) CEO. Graduate school in 1980.

Notable Teachers
 Lu Simian (1884–1957): a prominent Chinese historian.

Past Principals
 Tu Yuan Bo (1907–1913)
 Tong Bo Zhang (1913–1925)
 Shi Shaoxi (1951–1966, 1978–1985)
 Ding Haosheng (1985–2000)
 Han Tao (2001–2003)
 Wang Dingxin (2003–2008)
 Ding Weiming (2008-2010)
Zhang Yaoqi (2010-2014)
 Shi Pinnan (2014- )

References

External links
 Official web site in Chinese

Educational institutions established in 1907
High schools in Jiangsu
Buildings and structures in Changzhou
1907 establishments in China